Stina Larsson (born 1977) is a Swedish politician.  she serves as Member of the Riksdag representing the constituency of Skåne Southern. She is affiliated with the Centre Party. She also served as a substitute member in the Riksdag in 2005 and in 2020.

References 

Living people
1977 births
Place of birth missing (living people)
21st-century Swedish politicians
21st-century Swedish women politicians
Members of the Riksdag 2022–2026
Members of the Riksdag from the Centre Party (Sweden)
Women members of the Riksdag